Caroline Nordengrip (born 1980) is a Swedish politician and member of the Riksdag since 2018 for the Sweden Democrats. She represents the constituency of Västra Götaland County.

Nordengrip is a native of Bollebygd where she has sat on the local council for the SD. She has also served as the party's national ombudsman. She has cited concerns about security, transport and the countryside as her main reasons for getting involved in politics. In parliament, Nordengrip has called for harsher penalties against convicted pedophiles.

References 

Living people
1980 births
Members of the Riksdag from the Sweden Democrats
Members of the Riksdag 2018–2022
21st-century Swedish women politicians
Women members of the Riksdag